German Life is a current bi-monthly magazine written for all people interested in the diversity of German, Austrian, and Swiss culture yesterday and today, and in the various ways that North America has been shaped by its German heritage element. The magazine is dedicated to solid reporting on cultural, historical, social, and political events.

Published by Zeitgeist Publishing Inc. from their headquarters in La Vale, Maryland; the magazine was first published in 1994.

According to WorldCat, it is held in over 265  libraries, and is included in the index Ethnic Newswatch

References

External links
Official website

1994 establishments in Maryland
Austrian-American history
Bimonthly magazines published in the United States
German-American culture in Maryland
German-American history
Lifestyle magazines published in the United States
Local interest magazines published in the United States
Magazines established in 1994
Magazines published in Maryland
Swiss-American culture in Maryland
Swiss-American history